, commonly known as Long Long Man, is a 2017 series of television commercials produced in Japan by Hakuhodo for UHA Mikakuto Co. Ltd., the manufacturer of Sakeru Gummy and Long Sakeru Gummy. The 11-part series of commercials follow a couple that loves Sakeru Gummy and their conflict with a mysterious man who eats a longer version of the candy.

Plot
Chi-chan and Tooru-san love Sakeru Gummy, but one day, they see "Long Long Man", a mysterious mustached man tearing off a strip of Long Sakeru Gummy as seductive jazz music plays in the background. Since that day, Chi-chan has been obsessed with Long Long Man and anything of great length. Her relationship with Tooru-san is strained when he discovers a pack of Long Sakeru Gummy in her apartment, indicating Chi-chan had been cheating. During their argument, Chi-chan passes out and lies to Tooru-san that she has a short life, and looking at long things relieves her of her worries. When Chi-chan's friend explains that regular Sakeru Gummy is simply Long Sakeru Gummy trimmed in smaller bites, Chi-chan reconciles with Tooru-san, despite her persistent obsession with Long Long Man. On the day of their wedding, they once again encounter Long Long Man, and Chi-chan tries to leave Tooru-san for him, only for Long Long Man to reveal that he was in love with Tooru-san all along.

Cast
Risako Itō as 
Seiji Suzuki as 
Yukiyoshi Ozawa as

Episodes

Awards
The commercial series won the Silver Lion at the 2018 Cannes Lions International Festival of Creativity, the Bronze Award at the 2019 AdFest, the ACC Grand Prix, Minister of Internal Affairs and Communications Award at ACC Tokyo Creativity Awards 2018, and the 2018 TCC Advertising Award Grand Prix.

References

External links
 (Hakuhodo)
 (Sakeru Gummy)

2017 in Japanese television
2010s television commercials
Japanese television commercials
Viral videos
Internet memes
Internet memes introduced in 2017
LGBT portrayals in mass media